Whistle Stop is a 1963 Soviet comedy film directed by Boris Barnet.

Plot 
The film tells about the academician, who is going to rest in the village. But there it was not as calm as he thought.

Cast 
 Vasiliy Merkurev as Pavel Pavlovich (as V. Merkuryev)
 Yekaterina Mazurova as Grandmother Tatyana (as Ye. Mazurova)
 Nadezhda Rumyantseva as Sima - Kolkhoz accountant (as N. Rumyantseva)
 Boris Novikov as Kolkhoz foreman (as B. Novikov)
 A. Berezovskaya as Klavka - milkmaid
 Elizaveta Nikishchikhina as Zoika - shopgirl (as Ye. Nikishchikhina)
 Aleksandr Potapov as Ivan - tractor driver (as A. Potapov)
 Valeri Ryzhakov as Vasya - driver (as V. Ryzhakov)

References

External links 
 

1963 films
1960s Russian-language films
Soviet comedy films
1963 comedy films